The Surface Heat Budget of the Arctic Ocean (SHEBA) study was a National Science Foundation-funded research project designed to quantify the heat transfer processes that occur between the ocean and the atmosphere over the course of a year in the Arctic Ocean, where the sun is above the horizon from spring through summer and below the horizon the rest of the time. The study was designed to provide data for use in global climate models, which scientists use to study global climate change.

Background
Ice reflects sunlight more readily than open water. Snow-covered sea ice reflects about 80% of the incident sunlight. Seasonal changes in the Arctic result in clear skies and radiational cooling from snow-covered sea ice in the constantly dark arctic winter. In spring, with the return of sunlight, melt pools begin to form and increase the rate of heat absorption from the sun. In the summer, during constant daylight, clouds form which reflect light to the sky, but impede heat flow from the ocean. In order to quantify these effects over a large portion of earth's area—the Arctic Ocean—required a large-scale scientific data-gathering and analysis effort over the span of a year. Consequently, the National Science Foundation, together with other sponsors, funded a study to better quantify these processes.

Ice Station SHEBA

The scientific party traveled aboard the Canadian Coast Guard Ship Des Groseilliers to the Arctic Ocean. It arrived at a location on 2 October 1997 where the plan was to allow the ship to become frozen in the pack ice and be the base for scientific observations. Those observations included measurements of the oceanic and atmospheric processes from the water beneath the ice, near the ship, to the top of the atmosphere. Measurements included:  
 Radiative fluxes: longwave and shortwave
 Heat flux: turbulent fluxes of latent and sensible heat
 Cloud height, thickness and other properties
 Processes of energy exchange in the boundary layers of the atmosphere and ocean
 Snow depth and ice thickness
 Ocean salinity, temperature, and currents
The ship remained stationary with respect to the ice for one year, leaving on 11 October 1998. It became known as "Ice Station SHEBA."

Results

The scientists found clouds to be common at the ship's location throughout the year. In the midwinter, there was reportedly overcast 40% of the time and in the summer the sky was continually overcast. Air temperature was 0.6 °C lower than the regional climatological average temperature. With no sun in the winter, the net flow of heat (flux) was from the surface of the ocean to the sky, marked with large differences in flux with changes in cloud cover. In April the flux changed toward solar warming of the surface of the sea, which reached a maximum in July when sunlight was strongest and the ice developed melt ponds which were much darker than snow and could absorb sunlight more efficiently.

The scientists also measured the net change in mass of the ice and snow pack at 100 sites. They noted a wide variability of change over the region surrounding the ship. They determined that, with the waning sunlight of fall, the temperature in the ice dropped such that, by November, it was generating new growth at the bottom of the ice pack. From these observations, they identified five phases of change in heat budget:
 Dry snow
 Melting snow
 Pond formation
 Pond evolution
 Fall freeze-up.

Modeling
The experimental results allowed meaningful modeling of the seasonal heat budget processes occurring through the Arctic Ocean sea ice and atmosphere. The scope of the model was the column from below the ice pack through the top of the atmosphere. The scientists realized that key to the model was correctly characterizing the changing reflectivity or albedo of the ice surface, owing to changes in snow pack and ice melting. Cloud cover was key to describing how much energy reached or escaped the ocean surface.

Ocean processes

The model incorporated the observation that solar radiation is the dominant heat source to the surface. It accounted for the change in open ocean from a 5% maximum in June and the changes in albedo. Approximately 8% of incoming solar radiation was absorbed into the ocean through the ice.

Atmosphere processes
The scientists were able to define parameters for near-surface turbulence that characterize the degree to which air movement can cool or warm the surface of the ice, seasonally. In summer, the surface becomes rougher and slows down air flow. The lidar cloud measurements and balloonsonde temperature and turbulence data allowed scientific characterization of the role of the atmosphere above the ice in promoting or inhibiting the warming or cooling of the ocean surface.

Participants
The following individuals and organizations participated in SHEBA:

References

External links
National Science Foundation

Climatological research
National Science Foundation
Science and technology in the United States
Arctic Ocean